In telecommunications, particularly in radio frequency engineering, signal strength refers to the transmitter power output as received by a reference antenna at a distance from the transmitting antenna. High-powered transmissions, such as those used in broadcasting, are expressed in dB-millivolts per metre (dBmV/m).  For very low-power systems,  such as mobile phones, signal strength is usually expressed in dB-microvolts per metre (dBμV/m) or in decibels above a reference level of one milliwatt (dBm).  In broadcasting terminology, 1 mV/m is 1000 μV/m or 60 dBμ (often written dBu).

Examples
100 dBμ or 100 mV/m: blanketing interference may occur on some receivers 
60 dBμ or 1.0 mV/m: frequently considered the edge of a radio station's protected area in North America
40 dBμ or 0.1 mV/m: the minimum strength at which a station can be received with acceptable quality on most receivers

Relationship to average radiated power

The electric field strength at a specific point can be determined from the power delivered to the transmitting antenna, its geometry and radiation resistance. Consider the case of a center-fed half-wave dipole antenna in free space, where the total length L is equal to one half wavelength (λ/2). If constructed from thin conductors, the current distribution is essentially sinusoidal and the radiating electric field is given by

When the antenna is viewed broadside the electric field is maximum and given by 

Solving this formula for the peak current yields

The average power to the antenna is

where  is the center-fed half-wave antenna's radiation resistance.

Therefore, if the average power to a half-wave dipole antenna is 1 mW, then the maximum electric field at 313 m (1027 ft) is 1 mV/m (60 dBμ).

For a short dipole the current distribution is nearly triangular.  In this case, the electric field and radiation resistance are

Using a procedure similar to that above, the maximum electric field for a center-fed short dipole is

RF signals

Although there are cell phone base station tower networks across many nations globally, there are still many areas within those nations that do not have good reception. Some rural areas are unlikely to ever be covered effectively since the cost of erecting a cell tower is too high for only a few customers. Even in areas with high signal strength, basements and the interiors of large buildings often have poor reception.

Weak signal strength can also be caused by destructive interference of the signals from local towers in urban areas, or by the construction materials used in some buildings causing significant attenuation of signal strength. Large buildings such as warehouses, hospitals and factories often have no usable signal further than a few metres from the outside walls.

This is particularly true for the networks which operate at higher frequency since these are attenuated more by intervening obstacles, although they are able to use reflection and diffraction to circumvent obstacles.

Estimated received signal strength
The estimated received signal strength in an active RFID tag can be estimated as follows:

In general, you can take the path loss exponent into account:

The effective path loss depends on frequency, topography, and environmental conditions.

Actually, one could use any known signal power dBm0 at any distance r0 as a reference:

Number of decades
 would give an estimate of the number of decades, which coincides with an average path loss of 40 dB/decade.

Estimate the cell radius
When we measure cell distance r and received power  pairs,
we can estimate the mean cell radius as follows:

Specialized calculation models exist to plan the location of a new cell tower, taking into account local conditions and radio equipment parameters, as well as consideration that mobile radio signals have line-of-sight propagation, unless reflection occurs.

See also
 Cel-Fi
 Cell network
 Cell phone
 Cellular repeater
 Dropped call
 Dead zone (cell phone)
 Field strength in free space
 Field strength meter
 Received signal strength indication
 S meter
 Signal (electrical engineering)
 Mobile phone signal
 Mobile coverage

References

External links

 Global map of cell phone signal by network. Based on crowdsourced data.
 Crowd sourced map of cell and wifi signals. Data release under the Open Database License.

Radio electronics
Mobile technology

es:Repetidor celular
id:Penguat sinyal selular